born  in Kakuda, Miyagi, Japan) is a retired professional Grand Prix motorcycle road racer. He has raced extensively in Japanese and International championships. Ito has competed in the All Japan Road Race Championship, and won the Japanese 500 cc Championship, and is also 3 times Japanese Superbike Champion. In the prestigious Suzuka 8 Hour Endurance Race he has qualified on pole 5 times and won the race 3 times. Ito has also raced in Superbike World Championship. His considerable experience on different types of racing machine has earned him a reputation as a premier development rider.

Career

Early career
Ito competed in the All-Japan 500 cc Championship on a Honda NSR500 from 1988 to 1992, always finishing inside the Top 7 and winning the title in 1990. He raced in the Suzuka 8 Hour for three of these years and had two 7th-place finishes in 1988 and 1991, partnered by Masumitsu Taguchi and Daryl Beattie respectively. Ito has also competed in the 500 cc World Championships as an occasional wild card from 1989 to 1992. He showed impressive form, consistently finishing among the established Grand Prix riders. Ito scored a best finish of 4th at Suzuka in 1992.

500cc/MotoGP World Championship
Ito's ability was rewarded in 1993 with a full-time ride from Honda in the 500 cc World Championship. This was the third bike alongside Mick Doohan and Beattie, and often had development parts - widely speculated to have included a fuel-injection system before anybody else got it. In his first full Grand Prix season, he scored four top 5 finishes. Apart from 3 DNFs he never finished outside the top ten. His best result was at Hockenheim, Germany where he got pole position, followed by a 3rd place in the race. He was also the first Grand Prix rider to break the 200 mph (321.86 km/h) barrier. He finished a creditable 7th in the Championship. He also raced in the All-Japan 500 cc Championship where he finished 9th.

In 1994, Ito continued to show impressive form in the 500s scoring points in 11 out of 14 races, 9 of which were top 5 placings. His best result was at Brno where after qualifying 7th, he finished 2nd in the race, just 3 seconds behind teammate Mick Doohan, in what was otherwise a very strung-out race. Ito finished 7th in the Championship. He again competed in the Suzuka 8 Hour where he qualified 2nd and finished 3rd on a Honda RC45, partnered by Shinya Takeishi.

An elusive first 500 cc win still evaded Ito, until it seemed he might win his home race at Suzuka in 1995. In torrential rain, Ito used his vast experience of the Suzuka Circuit and pulled out a commanding lead in the race. With seven laps to go he was caught out by the treacherous conditions and crashed. This was to be his only non-score of what was to be a very consistent season. He visited the podium twice, his best finish was again 2nd, this time at the final round at Catalunya. His consistency of point scoring races meant he finished a career-best 5th in the 500 cc Championship. By now a regular top-runner in the Suzuka 8 Hour he qualified 6th and finished 2nd on a Honda RC45, partnered by Satoshi Tsujimoto.

His value as a development rider already recognised by Honda, in 1996 Ito moved from the Honda 500 V4 to their newly developed 500 cc V-twin Honda NSR500V in the World Championship. The V2 was underpowered compared to the V4 and Ito's best result was 6th at Catalunya. He was however regularly bringing the new bike home in the points, scoring in 12 of the 15 races. He finished in 12th place in what was to be his last full season in the Championship. In the Suzuka 8 Hour qualified 2nd and finished 11th partnered by Satoshi Tsujimoto.

Ito returned to domestic racing, this time in the Japanese Superbike Championship on board a Honda RC45 and was one of the top riders in the series, winning the title in 1998 and finishing every other year in the Top five. He also took his debut win at the Suzuka 8 Hour in 1997 partnered by Tohru Ukawa. This duo repeated the feat in 1998 from pole position. They again took pole position in 1999, but were to retire after 146 laps. During this time, Ito had numerous more wild card rides in both the 500 cc World Championship and the World Superbike Championship, his best result being an impressive 7th place on a Honda 500 V4 at Suzuka in 1999.

In 2000, Ito was recruited by Kanemoto Racing, who had been contracted by the Bridgestone tyre company to conduct tyre testing for the company's foray into World Championship 500 cc racing. Alongside fellow Japanese rider Nobuatsu Aoki, Ito was responsible for the testing and development of Bridgestone tyres on Honda NSR500 machines. In the Suzuka 8 Hour he qualified 5th and finished 8th in the race on a Honda VTR1000SPW, this time running in a three-man team with Tadayuki Okada and Alex Barros.

Now one of the most experienced and respected top level development riders, Ito was given a Honda RC211V for the inaugural round of the new four-stroke MotoGP series at Suzuka. He qualified in 3rd (0.2 seconds behind polesitter Valentino Rossi) and crossed the line in 4th. He made another wild card appearance at the penultimate round in Australia, this time with the Kanemoto Racing team on an NSR500 two-stroke machine testing Bridgestone tyres. He qualified 13th but retired midway through the race. In the Japanese Superbike Championship he made just one appearance in the domestic series scoring a 4th at Suzuka.

Ito returned to the Japanese Superbike Championship full-time and won the title in 2005 and 2006 on a Honda CBR1000RR. 
Still a top rider in endurance racing, he was to take three more pole positions in the Suzuka 8 Hour. This equalled Wayne Gardner's record of five Suzuka 8 Hour poles. He won the race for the third time in 2006, partnered by Takeshi Tsujimura. Ito was still in demand at international level, and in 2005 was drafted in to ride a Ducati Desmosedici GP5 in a new Ducati-Bridgestone Tyre Test Team, which was specifically created for MotoGP tyre development. This role was to expand further when works Ducati rider Loris Capirossi was injured and unable to race in Round 16 at the Turkish Grand Prix. Ito took the seat, becoming the first Japanese rider to pilot the Ducati. He qualified 15th, but during the race was subjected to a pit lane ride through penalty for jumping the start. Ito failed to enter the pits and was black-flagged from the race, and thence excluded from the results.

Ito continued to work with the Ducati-Bridgestone Tyre Test Team during the off-season. He crashed during pre-season testing at Motegi and suffered a fractured thighbone, putting his 2007 season plans on hold. He returned for the Suzuka 8 Hour race in July and finished in 3rd place having set the fastest lap of the race. He was partnered by Yusuka Teshima. Ito was given a ride on a Pramac d'Antin Ducati in the 2007 Japanese Grand Prix at Motegi following Alex Hofmann's release from the team.

At the Motegi GP in Japan in 2011, Ito and countryman Kousuke Akiyoshi were given wildcard rides in order to "bring courage and show support for the East Japan area", which has been suffering greatly in the aftermath of the 2011 Tohoku earthquake and tsunami. Ito, who came out of retirement that year to win the Suzuka 8 Hours and start the role as a HRC test rider, rode for a specially-formed HRC team at the age of 44.

Career statistics

Grand Prix motorcycle racing

Points system from 1988 to 1992:

Points system from 1993 onwards:

(key) (Races in bold indicate pole position; races in italics indicate fastest lap)

References

External links

 Shinichi Ito’s Official Site 

1966 births
Living people
Sportspeople from Miyagi Prefecture
Japanese motorcycle racers
500cc World Championship riders
Repsol Honda MotoGP riders
Superbike World Championship riders
Ducati Corse MotoGP riders
Pramac Racing MotoGP riders
MotoGP World Championship riders